Renata Babak (February 4, 1934 in Kharkiv, Ukraine – December 31, 2003 in Silver Spring, Maryland) was a Ukrainian mezzo-soprano who defected to America from the Bolshoi Opera in 1973.

Babak died in December 2003 from pancreatic cancer at her home in Silver Spring, Maryland.

References

External links

1934 births
2003 deaths
20th-century Ukrainian women opera singers
Ukrainian mezzo-sopranos
Deaths from pancreatic cancer
Deaths from cancer in Maryland
Musicians from Kharkiv
People from Silver Spring, Maryland
Soviet emigrants to the United States